Thamarachal (alternately Thamarachalpuram or Thamarachal Puram) is a town in Kizhakkambalam panchayath near city of Kochi, India. Thamarachal is where road from Oorakkad and Malayidomthuruth make a junction on road from Pukkattupadi to Kizhakkambalam.

Organizations
 KG PACKERS, Manufacturers of Corrugated Boxes Since 1999, Thamarachal.
 St Mary's Public School
 International School-The Charter School Kochi
 Samaritan College of Nursing, Pazhanganad,  near Kakkanad,  Kochi

Religious places
 St Mary's Jacobite Valiyapally, Thamarachal, 
 Sacred Heart Syro Malabar Catholic church,Thamarachal
St.  Augustine's Syro Malabar Catholic Church,  Pazhanganad, Kochi

Hospitals
 Samaritan Heart Institute,  Pazhanganad , near Kakkanad,  Kochi

Location

References 

Cities and towns in Ernakulam district